Clark National Forest was a National Forest in Missouri established on September 11, 1939 with . On July 1, 1973 it was administratively combined with Mark Twain National Forest, and on February 17, 1976 it was absorbed by Mark Twain.

The forest was named after Champ Clark, a state legislator.

References

External links
Forest History Society
Listing of the National Forests of the United States and Their Dates (from the Forest History Society website) Text from Davis, Richard C., ed. Encyclopedia of American Forest and Conservation History. New York: Macmillan Publishing Company for the Forest History Society, 1983. Vol. II, pp. 743-788.

Former National Forests of the United States
Mark Twain National Forest